Malikia is a genus of Gram-negative bacteria.

References

Comamonadaceae
Bacteria genera